Tirana International School, established in 1991 directly before the fall of the communist system in Albania, is an English-medium international school in Tirana, Albania. Its curriculum, while similar to US schools, contains links to both local culture and international educational elements. The current enrollment is approximately 400 students from 35 countries in preK – 12th grade classes. Tirana International School is part of Quality Schools International and is accredited by the Middle States Association of Colleges and Schools.

Curriculum
The curriculum focuses on English literacy skills, mathematics, cultural studies, the sciences, computer literacy, art, music, foreign languages (French, Spanish, German, Albanian and Russian) and physical education as part of the regular program. Intensive English classes are provided for those with a limited knowledge of the English language.  
 
TIS offers onsite the College Board Advanced Placement (AP) Capstone Diploma and individual AP courses. AP courses give students the opportunity to earn credit or advanced standing at most colleges and universities in the United States and Europe.

As of 2021, TIS offers the International Baccalaureate diploma (IB), so students choose the IB, AP, or standard TIS track to complete high school.

Grading System
Tirana International School adheres to a mastery learning approach to education that provides detailed feedback for students as they work toward ownership of the material. Grades reflect the current progress that students have made within a unit of study. The letter grade B is assigned when students demonstrate mastery of the subject, while an A grade represents mastery and the consistent, appropriate use of higher-order thinking skills. Students are given opportunities to continue their studies through extension activities that might lead to the upgrading of a B to an A. Students that do not fully master units of study are awarded no passing grade.

Faculty
There are around 80 teachers currently employed at TIS. There are also trained local educators that serve as classroom assistants.

Activities
Tirana International School offers a range of extra-curricular activities for students in the 5-year-old to the secondary level. Competitive sports and activities include volleyball, soccer, tennis, basketball, swimming, team robotics, model United Nations, cross country, and knowledge bowl. Musical activities include violin, guitar, piano, and choir. Younger children are offered a wide range of interest-based activities four times a week after school.

Tirana International School is a founding member of the Tirana Association of International Schools (TAIS) and a long-standing member of the Central and Eastern European School Association (CEESA). Middle school and secondary students participate in competitive and cultural events with member schools across Europe.

Facilities 
Tirana International School is situated on a 5.5-hectare site at the edge of the city in an upscale, secure residential area. The facility contains classroom space, music rooms, a full-size gymnasium, cafeteria, open-air terrace, full science lab, two technology labs, and a workout room. The outside territory features a soccer pitch, tennis court, track, and a multi-purpose court.

References

External links

Quality Schools International

Educational institutions established in 1991
International schools in Albania
Quality Schools International
Education in Tirana
1991 establishments in Albania
Buildings and structures in Tirana
Schools in Tirana